Takht-e Malek may refer to:
 Takht-e Malek, Khuzestan
 Takht-e Malek, Sistan and Baluchestan